The 17th Busan International Film Festival was held from October 4 to October 13, 2012 at the Busan Cinema Center and was hosted by Ahn Sung-ki and Chinese actress Tang Wei, who is the first foreign celebrity to host the event.

In this year's festival, a total of 304 films from 75 countries was screened, with 93 serving as world premieres and 39 serving as international premieres. The event was attended by more than 10,000 guests from over 60 countries.

The 304 films, which includes films from countries such as Japan, India, the Philippines, Thailand, and Indonesia, were played on 37 screens in seven theaters in Busan, including Busan Cinema Center, CGV Centum City, Lotte Cinema Centum City, and Megabox Haeundae.

Program
† World premiere
†† International premiere

Opening Film

Gala Presentation

A Window on Asian Cinema

New Currents

Korean Cinema Today - Panorama
{| class="sortable wikitable" width="95%" cellpadding="5"
|-
!width="30%"| English title
!width="40%"| Original title
!width="20%"| Director(s)
!width="10%"| Production country/countries
!width="3%"| 
|-
|Architecture 101 || 건축학개론Geonchukhakgaeron(lit. "Introduction to Architecture") || Lee Yong-ju || South Korea ||
|-
|Behind the Camera || 뒷담화: 감독이 미쳤어요Dwitdamhwa: Gamdokyi Micheotseoyo || E J-yong || South Korea ||†
|-
|The Concubine || 후궁: 제왕의 첩Hugoong: Jewangui Chub(lit. "Royal Concubine: Concubine to the King")|| Kim Dae-seung || South Korea ||
|-
|A Muse || 은교Eun-gyo || Jung Ji-woo || South Korea ||
|-
|Helpless || 화차Hwa-cha|| Byun Young-joo || South Korea ||
|-
|In Another Country || 다른 나라에서Dareun Naraeseo || Hong Sang-soo || South Korea ||
|-
|My Way || 마이 웨이Mai Wei || Kang Je-gyu || South Korea ||
|-
|Nameless Gangster: Rules of the Time || 범죄와의 전쟁Bumchoiwaui Junjaeng(lit. "War on Crime: The Golden Age of the Bad Guys") || Yoon Jong-bin || South Korea ||
|-
|Perfect Number || 용의자XYonguija X(lit. "Suspect X") || Bang Eun-jin || South Korea ||
|-
|Pietà || 피에타 || Kim Ki-duk || South Korea ||
|-
|The Taste of Money || 돈의 맛Donui Mat || Im Sang-soo || South Korea ||
|-
|Touch || 터치Teochi || Min Byung-hun || South Korea ||†
|-
|Tumbleweed || 창수Changsoo || Lee Duk-hee || South Korea ||†
|-
|The Ugly Duckling || 미운오리새끼Miwoonorisaeggi || Kwak Kyung-taek || South Korea ||
|-
|The Weight || 무게Muge || Jeon Kyu-hwan || South Korea ||
|-
|Two Weddings and a Funeral || 두 번의 결혼식과 한 번의 장례식Du Beon-ui Gyeol-hon-sik-gwa Han Beon-ui Jang-nye-sik || Kim Jho Kwang-soo || South Korea ||
|-
|The Winter of the Year was Warm || 내가 고백을 하면Naega Gobaekeul Hamyeon || David Cho || South Korea ||
|}

Korean Cinema Today - Vision

Korean Cinema Retrospective

Shin Young-kyun, the Male Icon of Korean Cinema: From Farmhand to King

World Cinema

Flash Forward

Wide Angle

Korean Short Film Competition

Asian Short Film Competition

Short Film Showcase

Documentary Competition

Documentary Showcase

Animation Showcase

Open Cinema

Special Program in Focus

The Eternal Travelers for Freedom: Sergei Parajanov and Mikhail Vartanov

Afghanistan National Film Archive: The Rise from the Ashes

Poland in Close-up: The Great Polish Masters

Arturo Ripstein: Four Stories of Captive Minds

Cinema Archaeology

Special Screening

Midnight Passion

Closing Film

 Awards 
New Currents Award  36 - Nawapol Thamrongrattanarit (Thailand)Kayan - Maryam Najafi (Lebanon/Canada)
Special Mention: Filmistaan - Nitin Kakkar (India)
Flash Forward AwardFlower Buds - Zdeněk Jiráský (Czech Republic)
Sonje AwardA Little Farther - Nikan Nezami (Iran)The Night of the Witness - Park Buem (South Korea)
Special Mention: Transferring - Junichi Kanai (Japan)
BIFF Mecenat AwardEmbers - Tamara Stepanyan (Lebanon/Qatar/Armenia)Anxiety - Min Hwan-ki (South Korea)
Special Mention: Wellang Trei - Kim Tae-il (South Korea)
FIPRESCI Award36 - Nawapol Thamrongrattanarit (Thailand)
NETPAC AwardJiseul - O Muel (South Korea)
KNN Movie AwardTouch of the Light - Chang Jung-Chi (Taiwan)
DGK Award
Director: O Muel (Jiseul) (South Korea)
Director: Shin Yeon-shick (The Russian Novel) (South Korea)
Actor: Shim Hee-sub, Ahn Jae-hong, Kim Chang-hwan (Sunshine Boys) (South Korea)
Actress: Jang Young-nam (Azooma) (South Korea)
Busan Cinephile Award5 Broken Cameras - Emad Burnat, Guy Davidi (Palestine Israel, France, Netherlands)
Citizen Reviewers' AwardJiseul - O Muel (South Korea)
CGV Movie Collage AwardJiseul'' - O Muel (South Korea)
Korean Cinema Award
Hayashi Kanako (Japan)
Asian Filmmaker of the Year
Kōji Wakamatsu (Japan)

References

External links
Official site

Busan International Film Festival
Busan International Film Festival, 2012
Busan International Film Festival, 2012
Busan International Film Festival, 2012
2012 festivals in South Korea